Gazete ODTÜLÜ is an independent, unofficial online student newspaper of METU (ODTÜ in Turkish) in Ankara, Turkey.

Brief overview
When a group of students of METU founded Gazete ODTÜLÜ in October 2006, they have become the first online campus newspaper of Turkey. In their first anniversary, they have published a printed special edition which included the selected articles during the first year of their publication life.

History

Interviews
In 2 years’ period, Gazete ODTÜLÜ has landed interviews with famous entertainers, artists, and notable figures and academics of METU. These people include...

People

2008-09 Staff

Past Editors in Chief

References

Turkish news websites
Turkish-language newspapers
Publications established in 2006
Mass media in Ankara